Néstor Calderón Enríquez (born 14 February 1989), also known as el Avión (the Plane), is a former Mexican professional footballer who last played as a winger.

Club career
He was spotted and brought by José Manuel de la Torre from the youth squads of Rayados to Atlético Mexiquense, and from there was promoted to the first Toluca squad due to his great performance. Starting almost every game.

International career
Then Mexico national team coach Javier Aguirre in September 2009 called him to train with Mexico for the World Cup Qualifiers against Costa Rica and Honduras and later gave him his international debut in a friendly against Colombia in the United States.

Career statistics

International

Honours
Toluca
Mexican Primera División: Apertura 2008, Bicentenario 2010

Santos Laguna
Liga MX: Clausura 2015
Copa MX: Apertura 2014
Campeón de Campeones: 2015

Guadalajara
Liga MX: Clausura 2017
Copa MX: Clausura 2017
Supercopa MX: 2016

Mexico U23
CONCACAF Olympic Qualifying Championship: 2012
Toulon Tournament: 2012

Individual
Mexican Primera División Rookie of the Tournament: Apertura 2008
Liga MX Best XI: Clausura 2015

References

External links

1989 births
Living people
Footballers from Jalisco
Association football wingers
Mexican expatriate footballers
Mexico international footballers
Atlético Mexiquense footballers
Deportivo Toluca F.C. players
C.F. Pachuca players
Santos Laguna footballers
C.D. Guadalajara footballers
Club Universidad Nacional footballers
Club Celaya footballers
Salamanca CF UDS players
Liga MX players
Ascenso MX players
Segunda División B players
Mexican expatriate sportspeople in Spain
Expatriate footballers in Spain
Mexican footballers